Erik Michael Seegerer (born January 21, 1976 in São Paulo) is a water polo player from Brazil. He competed in four consecutive Pan American Games for his native country, starting in 1995. Seegerer won three silver medals at this event with the Brazil men's national water polo team.

References
 Profile

1976 births
Living people
Brazilian male water polo players
Water polo players from São Paulo
Brazilian people of German descent
Pan American Games silver medalists for Brazil
Pan American Games medalists in water polo
Water polo players at the 1995 Pan American Games
Water polo players at the 2003 Pan American Games
Water polo players at the 2007 Pan American Games
Medalists at the 1995 Pan American Games
Medalists at the 2003 Pan American Games
Medalists at the 2007 Pan American Games
South American champions
21st-century Brazilian people